Ștefan Odobleja (13 October 1902 – 4 September 1978) was a Romanian physician and scientist, considered in Romania to be one of the precursors of cybernetics and artificial intelligence.

His major work, Psychologie consonantiste (first published in 1938 and 1939, in Paris) introduced the concept of feedback in psychology, ten years before Norbert Wiener published his groundbreaking book, Cybernetics: Or Control and Communication in the Animal and the Machine.

Biography 
Odobleja was born into a family of peasants in 1903, in Valea Izvorului (now Ștefan Odobleja), Mehedinți County, Romania. He attended the Faculty of Medicine in Bucharest and became a physician.  He practiced medicine as a military doctor in Bucharest, Dej, Drobeta Turnu-Severin, Lugoj, Târgoviște, and other Romanian cities. Endowed with an uncommon capacity of work and with an astonishing inventive spirit, Odobleja left an impressive work to the posterity. His completed works run to over 50,000 pages.

In 1936, Odobleja published "Phonoscopy and the clinical semiotics". In 1937, he participated in the IXth International Congress of Military Medicine with a paper entitled "Demonstration de phonoscopie", where he disseminated a prospectus in French, announcing the appearance of his future work, "The Consonantist Psychology".

The most important of his writings is Psychologie consonantiste, in which Odobleja lays the theoretical foundations of the generalized cybernetics. I in 1938 and vol. II in 1939), contains almost 900 pages and includes 300 figures in the text. The author wrote at the time that "this book is... a table of contents, an index or a dictionary of psychology, [for] a ... great Treatise of Psychology that should contain 20–30 volumes".

Due to the beginning of World War II, the publication went unnoticed. The first Romanian edition of this work did not appear until 1982 (the first edition was published in French). The work was reprinted in 1983 as Cybernétique générale: psychologie consonantiste, science des sciences.

Odobleja retired from the army in 1946 and lived a modest life off his military pension. He died of cancer on September 4, 1978, leaving behind extensive manuscripts. He was buried at the Orthodox Cemetery in Drobeta-Turnu Severin.

Legacy
His paper, "Diversity and Unit in Cybernetics" was presented at the Fourth Congress of Cybernetics and Systems in Amsterdam, August in 1978, being reportedly received "with great acclaim".

As an appreciation for his work of mapping the unknown territory of the consonantist psychology, cybernetics, and general cybernetics, in 1990 Odobleja was elected posthumously an honorary member of the Romanian Academy.

In 1982 a group of scientists established in Lugoj the Cybernetics Academy "Ștefan Odobleja", an organization dedicated to promoting a better knowledge of general cybernetics; the organization is registered in Lugano, Switzerland, and is financed by the controversial Romanian billionaire Iosif Constantin Drăgan. High schools in Bucharest, Craiova, and Drobeta-Turnu Severin are named after Ștefan Odobleja. Streets in Bucharest, Craiova, Dej, Drobeta-Turnu Severin, Oradea, and Pitești are also named after him.

References

 Hinoveanu, Ilarie  – Ștefan Odobleja: între "aventura științifică" și patimile glorificării, Craiova, Scrisul Românesc, 2003.

External links 
 "Two Specialists in Cybernetics: Ștefan Odobleja and Norbert Weiner. Common and Different Features", by Nicolae Jurcau, Twentieth World Congress of Philosophy, Boston, Massachusetts, August 10–15, 1998
 

1902 births
1978 deaths
Carol Davila University of Medicine and Pharmacy alumni
Cyberneticists
People from Mehedinți County
Romanian military doctors
Romanian scientists
Romanian inventors
Members of the Romanian Academy elected posthumously
Deaths from cancer in Romania